James Percival Tulloch (27 June 1878 – 22 March 1944) was an Australian rules footballer who played with Fitzroy in the Victorian Football League (VFL).

Sources

External links

Fitzroy Football Club players
Australian rules footballers from Victoria (Australia)
1878 births
1944 deaths